ETN may refer to:
 Chim-Nir Aviation, an Israeli airline
 Eastern Television Network, in Somalia
 Eaton Corporation, an American industrial manufacturer
 Erie Times-News, a daily newspaper in Erie, Pennsylvania
 Erythema toxicum neonatorum
 Erythritol tetranitrate
 E.T.N.: The Extraterrestrial Nasty, a 1967 American horror film
 Eton language (Vanuatu)
 Europe Trust Netherlands
 Exchange-traded note
 Travis Etienne, an American football running back